Haft Cheshmeh (also known as Markazi Bekhesh) is a city in Kakavand-e Sharqi Rural District, Kakavand District, Delfan County, Lorestan Province, Iran. At the 2006 census, its population was 417, in 100 families.

References 

Towns and villages in Delfan County
Cities in Lorestan Province